The Communauté d'agglomération de Lens – Liévin is the communauté d'agglomération, an intercommunal structure, centred on the cities of Lens and Liévin. It is located in the Pas-de-Calais department, in the Hauts-de-France region, northern France. It was created in January 2000. It adopted the name Communaupole on June 25, 2004. Its area is 239.4 km2. Its population was 241,703 in 2018, of which 31,606 in Lens and 30,423 in Liévin.

Composition
The Communauté d'agglomération de Lens – Liévin consists of the following 36 communes:

Ablain-Saint-Nazaire
Acheville
Aix-Noulette
Angres
Annay
Avion
Bénifontaine
Billy-Montigny
Bouvigny-Boyeffles
Bully-les-Mines
Carency
Éleu-dit-Leauwette
Estevelles
Fouquières-lès-Lens
Givenchy-en-Gohelle
Gouy-Servins
Grenay
Harnes
Hulluch
Lens
Liévin
Loison-sous-Lens
Loos-en-Gohelle
Mazingarbe
Méricourt
Meurchin
Noyelles-sous-Lens
Pont-à-Vendin
Sains-en-Gohelle
Sallaumines
Servins
Souchez
Vendin-le-Vieil
Villers-au-Bois
Vimy
Wingles

References

External links
 Communaupole of Lens-Liévin website

Lens-Lievin
Lens-Lievin